Karolina Talach (born 3 September 1992) is a Polish judoka.

She is the gold medallist of the 2016 Judo Grand Prix Zagreb in the -63 kg category.

References

External links

 

1992 births
Living people
Polish female judoka
European Games competitors for Poland
Judoka at the 2019 European Games
21st-century Polish women